The governor of Louisiana is the head of state and head of government  of the U.S. state of Louisiana. The governor is the head of the executive branch of Louisiana's state government and is charged with enforcing state laws.

Democrat John Bel Edwards has held the office since January 2016.

Governors

Governor of the Territory of Orleans
Louisiana was purchased by the United States from France in 1803. On October 1, 1804, Orleans Territory was organized from the southern part of the Purchase, with the remainder being made the District of Louisiana and placed under the jurisdiction of Indiana Territory. The District of Louisiana would later become Louisiana Territory, but after Orleans Territory became the state of Louisiana, Louisiana Territory was renamed Missouri Territory.

Governors of the State of Louisiana
Louisiana was admitted to the Union on April 30, 1812. It seceded from the Union on January 26, 1861, and was a founding member of the Confederate States of America on February 8, 1861. However, since substantial parts of the state remained in Union hands throughout the war, there were 2 lines of governors elected. Following the end of the American Civil War, Louisiana during Reconstruction was part of the Fifth Military District, which exerted some control over governor appointments and elections. Louisiana was readmitted to the Union on July 9, 1868.

The 1812 constitution established the office of governor, to serve for four years starting from the fourth Monday after the election. In 1845, the start date was moved to the fourth Monday of the January after the election; in 1864, it was moved to the second Monday of the January after the election; in 1879 it was moved to the first Monday after the General Assembly announced the election result; the 1921 Constitution fixed the new inauguration date as the second Tuesday in May. The 1974 Constitution changed the date, effective in 1980, to the second Monday of the March following the election; this was amended in 1987, to become effective in 1992, to the second Monday of January. Governors were not allowed to succeed themselves until 1864, when the constitution held no term limits. The restriction on governors succeeding themselves was reintroduced in 1868, removed again in 1879, and again added in 1898. An amendment to the constitution passed in 1966 allowed governors to succeed themselves once before requiring a gap before they can be elected again. Five governors have served nonconsecutive terms. Andre B. Roman, Francis T. Nicholls, and  Jimmie Davis each served two non-consecutive terms, while Earl Long and Edwin Edwards both served in three distinct stints.

In the event of a vacancy, the President of the Senate originally acted as governor. The 1845 constitution created the office of lieutenant governor, to be elected at the same time and manner as the governor and who would act as governor in the event of a vacancy. The 1913 constitution established that the lieutenant governor would become governor in case of a vacancy. The governor and lieutenant governor are not elected on a ticket.

See also
 List of Louisiana state legislatures
 List of colonial governors of Louisiana
 Gubernatorial lines of succession in the United States#Louisiana

Notes

References 
General

 
 
 
 
 

Specific

External links 

 Office of the Governor of Louisiana

Lists of state governors of the United States

Governors
Governors
Governor